The 112th Infantry were an infantry regiment of the East India Company's Bombay Army and later the British Indian Army. The regiment traces their origins to 1796, when they were raised as the 2nd Battalion, 6th Regiment of Bombay Native Infantry.

The regiments first action was on the Battle of Khadki in the Third Anglo-Maratha War. They also took part in the Battle of Miani and the Battle of Hyderabad during the conquest of Sindh. They next took part in the central Indian campaign after the Indian Rebellion of 1857. During World War I they were attached to the 17th Indian Division in the Mesopotamia Campaign. They were involved in the action at Fat-ha Gorge on the Little Zab and the Battle of Sharqat in October 1918.

After World War I the Indian government reformed the army moving from single battalion regiments to multi battalion regiments. In 1922, the 112th Infantry became the 3rd Battalion 4th Bombay Grenadiers. After independence they were one of the regiments allocated to the Indian Army.

Predecessor names 
2nd Battalion, 6th Regiment of Bombay Native Infantry – 1796
12th Bombay Native Infantry – 1824
12th Bombay Infantry – 1885
112th Infantry – 1903

References

Bibliography 

Moberly, F.J. (1923). Official History of the War: Mesopotamia Campaign, Imperial War Museum. 

British Indian Army infantry regiments
Bombay Presidency
Military units and formations established in 1796
Military units and formations disestablished in 1922
1796 establishments in British India